Thayer Junction is an unincorporated community in Sweetwater County, in the U.S. state of Wyoming.

References

Unincorporated communities in Sweetwater County, Wyoming
Unincorporated communities in Wyoming